= Mihaela oil field =

Black Sea oil field

Mihaela
- Country: Romania
- Region: Black Sea
- Block: Pelican
- Offshore/onshore: offshore
- Operator: Sterling Resources

Field history
- Discovery: 2010
- Start of development: 2014
- Start of production: 2015

Production
- Current production of oil: 3,500 barrels per day (~1.7×10^{5} t/a)
- Estimated oil in place: 12.8 million tonnes (~ 14×10^{6} m^{3} or 91 million bbl)

The Mihaela oil field is an oil field located on the continental shelf of the Black Sea. It was discovered in 2010 and developed by Sterling Resources. It will begin production in 2015 and will produce oil. The total proven reserves of the Mihaela oil field are around 91 million barrels (12.8 million tonnes), and production is centered on 3,500 barrels per day (560 m^{3}/d).
